The Russian National Freestyle Wrestling Championships 2022 (also known as the Russian Nationals 2022) was held in Kyzyl, Tuva by the Russian Wrestling Federation at the Sport complex of Subedey between 24 June to 26 June 2022.

Men's freestyle

See also 

2021 Russian National Freestyle Wrestling Championships
2020 Russian National Freestyle Wrestling Championships
2019 Russian National Freestyle Wrestling Championships
2018 Russian National Freestyle Wrestling Championships
2017 Russian National Freestyle Wrestling Championships
Soviet and Russian results in men's freestyle wrestling

References 

Russian National Freestyle Wrestling Championships
2022 in sport wrestling
2022 in Russian sport
Wrestling